Raúl Horacio Balbi (born October 7, 1973) is an Argentine professional boxer. Although Balbi currently competes in the light welterweight division, he is most notable for having won the WBA world lightweight title.

Professional career
Balbi made his professional debut on November 19, 1993 in Mercedes, Corrientes, Argentina. Balbi made a victorious start to his career by knocking out Juan Bautista Sosa in the first round. One of the highlights of Balbi's early career came on June 3, 1995 when he beat Simon Canache to claim the South American lightweight title. The first loss of Balbi's career came on September 9, 1995 when he lost to Manuel Alberto Billalba via a ten round points decision, Balbi avenged this defeat later on in his career by beating Billalba twice.

On February 22, 1997 Balbi travelled to Hamburg, Germany to challenge the Uzbek champion Artur Grigorian for the WBO lightweight title. Balbi's challenge proved to be unsuccessful, as Grigorian scored an eleventh round technical knockout. After the fight Balbi returned to Argentina, where he put together a run of five wins before losing a split decision to Walter Hugo Rodriguez.

Balbi remained undefeated over his next sixteen bouts, earning him a chance to fight Alberto Esteban Sicurella in a WBA title eliminator. Balbi won the fight by tenth round technical knockout, which led to a world title challenge against the French champion Julien Lorcy on October 8, 2001 in Paris. In the third round of the contest Balbi was able to open a large cut above the champion's right eye and had further success when he knocked Lorcy down in the seventh. The fight lasted the twelve round distance and Balbi was announced as the winner via a majority decision.

The first defence of Balbi's title took place on January 5, 2002 against Leonard Dorin in San Antonio, Texas. After a toe-to-toe battle which lasted the full twelve rounds, the Romanian challenger Dorin was announced the winner by split decision. After the fight a surprised Balbi claimed that he was "robbed". A rematch occurred five months later, this time in Bucharest, Romania. On this occasion Dorin won a unanimous decision with scores of: 118-111, 117-112 and 118-110.

A run of six consecutive wins earned Balbi another shot at the WBA title, this time for the vacant light welterweight belt. The fight took place in Bolton, United Kingdom on September 2, 2006, against the Frenchman Souleymane M'baye. Balbi was knocked down twice en route to a fourth round loss via technical knockout, thus handing the title to M'baye. Since his light welterweight title challenge Balbi has lost three times. His most recent match, a draw against Bolivian boxer Franklin Mamani, took place on May 28, 2010.

Professional boxing record 

|-
| style="text-align:center;" colspan="8"|55 Wins (38 knockouts), 11 Losses (4 knockouts), 2 Draws
|-  style="text-align:center; background:#e3e3e3;"
|  style="border-style:none none solid solid; "|Res.
|  style="border-style:none none solid solid; "|Record
|  style="border-style:none none solid solid; "|Opponent
|  style="border-style:none none solid solid; "|Type
|  style="border-style:none none solid solid; "|RoundTime
|  style="border-style:none none solid solid; "|Date
|  style="border-style:none none solid solid; "|Location
|  style="border-style:none none solid solid; "|Notes
|- align=center
|style="background:#abcdef;"|Draw||55–11–2||align=left| Franklin Mamani
|
|
|
|align=left|
|align=left|
|- align=center
|Loss||55–11–1||align=left| Guillermo de Jesus Paz
|
|
|
|align=left|
|align=left|
|- align=center
|Loss||55–10–1||align=left| Denis Shafikov
|
|
|
|align=left|
|align=left|
|- align=center
|Loss||55–9–1||align=left| Ionuţ Dan Ion
|
|
|
|align=left|
|align=left|
|- align=center
|Win||55–8–1||align=left| Diego Ponce
|
|
|
|align=left|
|align=left|
|- align=center
|Loss||54–8–1||align=left| Souleymane M'baye
|
|
|
|align=left|
|align=left|
|- align=center
|Win||54–7–1||align=left| Jorge Luis Noriega Medrano
|
|
|
|align=left|
|align=left|
|- align=center
|Win||53–7–1||align=left| Walter Diaz
|
|
|
|align=left|
|align=left|
|- align=center
|Win||52–7–1||align=left| Guillermo de Jesus Paz
|
|
|
|align=left|
|align=left|
|- align=center
|Win||51–7–1||align=left| Carlos Donquiz
|
|
|
|align=left|
|align=left|
|- align=center
|Win||50–7–1||align=left| Carlos Adán Jerez
|
|
|
|align=left|
|align=left|
|- align=center
|Win||49–7–1||align=left| Norberto Acosta
|
|
|
|align=left|
|align=left|
|- align=center
|Loss||48–7–1||align=left| Jose Rosa Gomez
|
|
|
|align=left|
|align=left|
|- align=center
|Loss||48–6–1||align=left| Leonard Doroftei
|
|
|
|align=left|
|align=left|
|- align=center
|Loss||48–5–1||align=left| Leonard Doroftei
|
|
|
|align=left|
|align=left|
|- align=center
|Win||48–4–1||align=left| Julien Lorcy
|
|
|
|align=left|
|align=left|
|- align=center
|Win||47–4–1||align=left| Vincent Howard
|
|
|
|align=left|
|align=left|
|- align=center
|Win||46–4–1||align=left| Alberto Sicurella
|
|
|
|align=left|
|align=left|
|- align=center
|Win||45–4–1||align=left| Justo Martinez
|
|
|
|align=left|
|align=left|
|- align=center
|Win||44–4–1||align=left| Ariel Aparicio
|
|
|
|align=left|
|align=left|
|- align=center
|Win||43–4–1||align=left| Walter Rodriguez
|
|
|
|align=left|
|align=left|
|- align=center
|Win||42–4–1||align=left| Ruben Oliva
|
|
|
|align=left|
|align=left|
|- align=center
|Win||41–4–1||align=left| Santos Rebolledo
|
|
|
|align=left|
|align=left|
|- align=center
|Win||40–4–1||align=left| Roberto Ortega
|
|
|
|align=left|
|align=left|
|- align=center
|Win||39–4–1||align=left| Luis Sosa
|
|
|
|align=left|
|align=left|
|- align=center
|Win||38–4–1||align=left| Jorge David Gomez
|
|
|
|align=left|
|align=left|
|- align=center
|Win||37–4–1||align=left| Carlos Vilches
|
|
|
|align=left|
|align=left|
|- align=center
|style="background:#abcdef;"|Draw||36–4–1||align=left| Ruben Oliva
|
|
|
|align=left|
|align=left|
|- align=center
|Win||36–4||align=left| Hector Martinez
|
|
|
|align=left|
|align=left|
|- align=center
|Win||35–4||align=left| Daniel Zielinski
|
|
|
|align=left|
|align=left|
|- align=center
|Win||34–4||align=left| Marcelo Cesar
|
|
|
|align=left|
|align=left|
|- align=center
|Win||33–4||align=left| Victor Hugo Sanchez
|
|
|
|align=left|
|align=left|
|- align=center
|Win||32–4||align=left| Angel Vera
|
|
|
|align=left|
|align=left|
|- align=center
|Win||31–4||align=left| Hector Martinez
|
|
|
|align=left|
|align=left|
|- align=center
|Loss||30–4||align=left| Walter Rodriguez
|
|
|
|align=left|
|align=left|
|- align=center
|Win||30–3||align=left| Manuel Billalba
|
|
|
|align=left|
|align=left|
|- align=center
|Win||29–3||align=left| Raul Cardenas
|
|
|
|align=left|
|align=left|
|- align=center
|Win||28–3||align=left| Victor Hugo Sanchez
|
|
|
|align=left|
|align=left|
|- align=center
|Win||27–3||align=left| Angel Vera
|
|
|
|align=left|
|align=left|
|- align=center
|Win||26–3||align=left| Ramon Collado
|
|
|
|align=left|
|align=left|
|- align=center
|Loss||25–3||align=left| Artur Grigorian
|
|
|
|align=left|
|align=left|
|- align=center
|Win||25–2||align=left| Rildo Jose Oliveira
|
|
|
|align=left|
|align=left|
|- align=center
|Loss||24–2||align=left| Alberto Roda
|
|
|
|align=left|
|align=left|
|- align=center
|Win||24–1||align=left| Ramon Collado
|
|
|
|align=left|
|align=left|
|- align=center
|Win||23–1||align=left| Manuel Billalba
|
|
|
|align=left|
|align=left|
|- align=center
|Win||22–1||align=left| Sergio Atilio Martinez
|
|
|
|align=left|
|align=left|
|- align=center
|Win||21–1||align=left| Ricardo Vega
|
|
|
|align=left|
|align=left|
|- align=center
|Win||20–1||align=left| Simon Canache
|
|
|
|align=left|
|align=left|
|- align=center
|Loss||19–1||align=left| Manuel Billalba
|
|
|
|align=left|
|align=left|
|- align=center
|Win||19–0||align=left| Philippe Binante
|
|
|
|align=left|
|align=left|
|- align=center
|Win||18–0||align=left| Faustino Martires Barrios
|
|
|
|align=left|
|align=left|
|- align=center
|Win||17–0||align=left| Simon Canache
|
|
|
|align=left|
|align=left|
|- align=center
|Win||16–0||align=left| Daniel Zielinski
|
|
|
|align=left|
|align=left|
|- align=center
|Win||15–0||align=left| Pedro Villegas
|
|
|
|align=left|
|align=left|
|- align=center
|Win||14–0||align=left| Ruben Astorga
|
|
|
|align=left|
|align=left|
|- align=center
|Win||13–0||align=left| Fabian Bazan
|
|
|
|align=left|
|align=left|
|- align=center
|Win||12–0||align=left| Marco Antonio Dos Santos
|
|
|
|align=left|
|align=left|
|- align=center
|Win||11–0||align=left| Rene Adelqui Collado
|
|
|
|align=left|
|align=left|
|- align=center
|Win||10–0||align=left| Omar Victoriano Alegre
|
|
|
|align=left|
|align=left|
|- align=center
|Win||9–0||align=left| Daniel Zielinski
|
|
|
|align=left|
|align=left|
|- align=center
|Win||8–0||align=left| Stephan Galtier
|
|
|
|align=left|
|align=left|
|- align=center
|Win||7–0||align=left| Marcelo Gutierrez
|
|
|
|align=left|
|align=left|
|- align=center
|Win||6–0||align=left| Gustavo Cuello
|
|
|
|align=left|
|align=left|
|- align=center
|Win||5–0||align=left| Raul Notti
|
|
|
|align=left|
|align=left|
|- align=center
|Win||4–0||align=left| Philippe Mohammed Udofe
|
|
|
|align=left|
|align=left|
|- align=center
|Win||3–0||align=left| Jorge Carballo
|
|
|
|align=left|
|align=left|
|- align=center
|Win||2–0||align=left| Leonardo Tissera
|
|
|
|align=left|
|align=left|
|- align=center
|Win||1–0||align=left| Juan Bautista Sosa
|
|
|
|align=left|
|align=left|

References

External links

Living people
1973 births
Argentine male boxers
World Boxing Association champions
World lightweight boxing champions
Lightweight boxers
Light-welterweight boxers
Boxers from Buenos Aires